John Holmes Arnold (December 11, 1862 – March 29, 1944) was an American politician who served as the 34th lieutenant governor of Ohio from 1915 to 1917 under Governor Frank B. Willis. A 1917 publication of the Ohio General Assembly had this to say about Arnold:

Arnold died March 29, 1944, and is interred at Green Lawn Cemetery, Columbus, Ohio.

References

1944 deaths
1862 births
Burials at Green Lawn Cemetery (Columbus, Ohio)
Lieutenant Governors of Ohio
People from Freeport, Pennsylvania
Politicians from Columbus, Ohio